Events in the year 1992 in Bulgaria.

Incumbents 

 President: Zhelyu Zhelev
 Prime Minister: Philip Dimitrov (from 1991 until December 30) Lyuben Berov (from December 30 until 1994)

Events 

 12 – 19 January – The first direct presidential elections were held in Bulgaria. Incumbent President Zhelyu Zhelev of the Union of Democratic Forces won 52.8% of the vote in the second round.

References 

 
1990s in Bulgaria
Years of the 20th century in Bulgaria
Bulgaria
Bulgaria